AquaGib is the national utility company responsible for water supply and distribution in the British Overseas Territory of Gibraltar. It is responsible for the maintenance and operation of the water supply on the Rock. The company is a joint venture between the Government of Gibraltar and Northumbrian Water.

References

External links 
 Official site

Government agencies of Gibraltar
Water companies
Public services of Gibraltar